Federico Púa (born February 8, 1988 in Montevideo, Uruguay) is a Uruguayan footballer currently playing as a midfielder for Unión Temuco of the Primera B Chilena.

He is son of the Uruguayan football manager Víctor Púa.

Teams
  Peñarol 2008-2010
  Unión Temuco 2011–present

References

External links
 Profile at Tenfield Digital Profile at

1988 births
Living people
Uruguayan footballers
Uruguayan expatriate footballers
Peñarol players
Unión Temuco footballers
Expatriate footballers in Chile

Association football midfielders